Colabata thea is a moth in the Apatelodidae family. It was described by Schaus in 1924. It is found in Argentina.

References

Natural History Museum Lepidoptera generic names catalog

Apatelodidae
Moths described in 1924